Harmonie is a state park in Indiana.

Harmonie has many hiking trails and includes sheltered areas, a seasonal nature center with animal exhibits inside, it also has interpretive programs, a pool, and many other features. The park receives about 130,000 visitors annually.

The park is 1 of 14 Indiana State Parks that are in the path of totality for the 2024 solar eclipse, with 3 minutes and 50 seconds of totality.

References

External links
Harmonie State Park- Official web page

Protected areas established in 1966
State parks of Indiana
Protected areas of Posey County, Indiana
New Harmony, Indiana
Nature centers in Indiana
1966 establishments in Indiana